The International Submarine Escape and Rescue Liaison Office ("ISMERLO") is an organization that coordinates international submarine search and rescue operations.  It was established in 2003 by NATO and the Submarine Escape and Rescue Working Group (SMERWG).  The office was established following the disaster of the Russian submarine K-141 Kursk. The office aims to provide an international liaison service to prevent peacetime submarine accidents, and to quickly respond on a global basis if they do occur.

It consists of an international team of submarine escape and rescue experts based at Northwood, UK. The aim of ISMERLO is to establish endorsed procedures as the international standard for submarine escape and rescue using consultation and consensus among submarine-operating nations. Advice on training and procurement as well as an inspection and monitoring service is also offered. The organization provides online information about Submarine Escape and Rescue (SMER) and aims to enable the rapid call out of international rescue systems in the event of a submarine accident.

The Submarine Escape and Rescue Working Group (SMERWG) covers technical and procedural issues, and aims to share information and define mutually accepted standards for design and operation of SMER systems. It also provides a forum for problems and exercises to be discussed with experts in the field.

Activities
On 21 April 2021 the Indonesian Navy sent a request to ISMERLO for assistance regarding KRI Nanggala (402), which went missing 95 km (51 nautical miles) north of Bali during a torpedo drill.

See also

References

External links
ISMERLO participates in international exercise
ISMERLO Office Opens

Submarine rescue organizations
Bodies of NATO
Emergency organizations
Organizations established in 2003